The Wistätthorn (also spelled Wistätthore) is a mountain of the Bernese Alps, located west of Lenk in the Bernese Oberland.

References

External links
 Wistätthorn on Hikr

Mountains of the Alps
Mountains of Switzerland
Mountains of the canton of Bern
Two-thousanders of Switzerland